Regional elections were held in some regions of Italy during 2001. These included:

Sicily on 24 June
Molise on 11 November

Elections in Italian regions
2001 elections in Italy